Mikhail Viktorovich Zudenkov (born 13 April 1970) is a former Russian football player.

References

1970 births
Living people
Soviet footballers
FC FShM Torpedo Moscow players
FC Asmaral Moscow players
Russian footballers
Russian Premier League players
Association football forwards
Association football midfielders